Beeswing (1833–1854) was a 19th-century British Thoroughbred racehorse from the north of England. In her day, Beeswing was hailed as the greatest mare in Britain and one of the greatest of all time.

Breeding
Her sire, Doctor Syntax was described by the noted racing writer "The Druid"  as "...scarcely fifteen hands, very broad at the base of the nose, with open nostrils, an eye full and bright as a hawk's, a high, drooping rump, and on the side view rather short quartered. He was quite a mouse in his colour."  But he took the Preston Gold Cup seven times, the Richmond Gold Cup five times, and the Lancaster Gold Cup five times as well. On both her dam's and her sire's side, Beeswing was descended from two renowned stallions, Eclipse (5x5x5) and Herod (5x5).

Racing career
Beeswing raced at many venues between 1835 and 1842 and was a real crowd favourite. Entering 63 events, she won an astonishing 51 times. Of the 57 races she finished, she was placed lower than second only once. Her most notable victory was in the Ascot Gold Cup of 1842. She won the Newcastle Cup no fewer than six times and was retired after winning the Doncaster Cup for the fourth time.

James Hill of Tyneside composed a hornpipe, "The Beeswing," named after her. Such was her fame that the Scottish village of Lochend in Dumfries and Galloway changed its name to Beeswing in her honour.

Stud record
Of her eight foals, five were sired by Touchstone. Four of her foals went on to become top class runners, two of which were Classic winners.  Many of today's top racehorses can trace their pedigree back to Beeswing. Some of her top runners were:
Nunnykirk (b. 1846) - won the 2,000 Guineas, ran 2nd in the St. Leger Stakes
Newminster (b. 1848) -  won the St. Leger Stakes, Leading sire in Great Britain & Ireland in 1859 and 1863

Pedigree

See also
 Repeat winners of horse races

References

 Profile of Beeswing at Thoroughbred Heritage
 Story of Beeswing at The Northern Echo's History Pages (Newsquest Media Group - A Gannett Company)

External links
 Beeswing's pedigree and partial racing stats
 Thoroughbred Heritage Portraits

Racehorses trained in the United Kingdom
Racehorses bred in the United Kingdom
1833 racehorse births
1854 racehorse deaths
Thoroughbred family 8
Godolphin Arabian sire line